The National Basketball Association (NBA) is the major professional basketball league in North America. The league was founded in 1946 as the Basketball Association of America (BAA). The league adopted its current name at the start of  when it merged with the National Basketball League (NBL). The league currently consists of thirty teams, of which twenty-nine are located in the United States and one in Canada. Each team plays 82 games in the regular season. Eight teams from each of the league's two conferences qualify for the playoffs. The winners of the Conference Finals advance to the finals to determine the NBA champions.

The Boston Celtics have had or tied for the best regular season record a record 18 times. They won the Eastern Conference 10 times, while the Los Angeles Lakers won the Western Conference 19 times. The Celtics and Lakers have each won 17 NBA championships, the most in NBA history. The Lakers also have a record 32 Finals appearances. The Celtics and the Lakers had played each other in the Finals for a record 12 times. The Celtics won 9 of their matchups while the Lakers have only won 3.

In that season, the Warriors recorded 73 wins and 9 losses with a winning percentage of .890, surmounting the 1995–96 Chicago Bulls, though the Bulls went on to win the Eastern Conference and the NBA championship. The Bulls and the Warriors are the only teams to win at least 70 games in a single season.

The Eastern champions have won 38 championships while the Western champions have won 33 championships. The defunct Central Division won one championship in 1950. Of the 75 championships, 34 of them were won by the teams who had or tied for the best regular season record. In 10 other occurrences, the teams who had or tied for the best regular season record, lost the Finals. Six teams that had the best regular season record and won the championships in the same season, were named to the list of Top 10 Teams in NBA History announced at the league's 50th anniversary in 1996. The Celtics, the Bulls, the Lakers and the Philadelphia 76ers each had two teams selected, while the Detroit Pistons and the New York Knicks each had one team selected.

List

Notes

 Each year is linked to an article about that particular BAA/NBA season.
 Each year is linked to an article about the BAA/NBA playoffs in that year.
 Each year is linked to an article about the BAA/NBA Finals in that year.
 Number of teams that participated in that particular season, including any teams that folded during the season.
 Number of regular season games played by each team.
 All team additions and subtractions occurred before the start of the season unless stated otherwise.
 Prior to 1971, there were no Eastern and Western champions, because the BAA Semifinals/Division Finals were meant to determine the BAA/NBA finalists, while division titles were always a regular season achievement.
 Due to the NBA's realignment into three divisions, the division champion with the best regular season record qualified automatically for the NBA Finals while the other two division champions faced off in the NBA semifinals to determine the other finalist. Eastern Division champion Syracuse had the best regular season record among the division champions, causing Central Division (no relation to the current Central Division) champion Minneapolis Lakers to face Western Division champion Anderson Packers in the NBA semifinals. The Lakers defeated the Packers to go to the Finals.
 There was no tiebreaker. Two teams with the best record received a first-round bye in the playoffs.
 Despite having the same record as the Washington Bullets, the Boston Celtics clinched top seed by winning the tiebreaker.
 Despite having the same record as the Philadelphia 76ers, the Boston Celtics clinched top seed by winning the tiebreaker.
 Despite having the same record as the Chicago Bulls, the Utah Jazz clinched top seed by virtue of winning their regular season series 2–0.
 Despite having the same record as the Utah Jazz, the San Antonio Spurs clinched top seed by virtue of winning their regular season series 2–1.
 Despite having the same record as the Dallas Mavericks, the San Antonio Spurs clinched top seed by virtue of having a better conference record (36–16 vs. Dallas's 34–18). The teams split their regular season series 2–2.
 Despite having the same record as the San Antonio Spurs, the Chicago Bulls clinched top seed by virtue of their only regular season meeting between them, a 96–89 victory by the Bulls on February 29, 2012.

References
General

Specific

External links

National Basketball Association lists